Anna Charlotta Juliana Adlerberg, née Baggehufwudt (1760-1839), was a Swedish pedagogue. She was the principal of the Smolny Institute in Saint Petersburg in 1802–1839.

Early life 
She was the daughter of the Batlic noble Friedrich Wilhelm von Baggehufwudt (1726-1785) and his wife, Charlotta Eleonora von Rosenthal-Pergel (1743-1768).

Marriage and issue 
Juliana married in 1785 to a Swedish Colonel in Russian service, Gustav Friedrich Adlerberg (d. 1794). She became the mother of the imperial governess Julia von Baranoff.

Biography 
In 1792, she was appointed governess for Grand Duke Nicholas and his brother, Grad Duke Michael of Russia. In 1802, she was appointed principal of the Smolny Institute.
She was made dame d’honneur in 1824 and received the order of St Catherine (second degree) in 1835. The park outside the Smolny Institute, Adlerbergskogo, was named after her.

Sources
Anna Charlotta Juliana Bagghufvud i Wilhelmina Stålberg, Anteckningar om svenska qvinnor (1864)

1760 births
1839 deaths
Educators from the Russian Empire
People from the Russian Empire of Swedish descent
Courtiers from the Russian Empire